Liolaemus tacnae is a species of lizard in the family Iguanidae or the family Liolaemidae. The species is endemic to Peru.
It is notable for being found higher than any other reptile, having been photographed at 5400 metres above sea level.

References

tacnae
Lizards of South America
Reptiles of Peru
Endemic fauna of Peru
Reptiles described in 1941
Taxa named by Benjamin Shreve